The 1970 Arkansas State Indians football team was an American football team that represented Arkansas State University as a member of the Southland Conference during the 1970 NCAA College Division football season. Led by Bennie Ellender in his eighth and final season as head coach, the Arkansas State compiled an overall record of 11–0 with a mark of 4–0 in conference play, winning the Southland title for the third consecutive season. The Indians were invited to the Pecan Bowl, where they defeated . Arkansas State was recognized by the Associated Press as the NCAA College Division national champion and by the UPI as the small college national champion.

Guard Bill Phillips received first-team honors on the 1970 Little All-America college football team. Running back Calvin Harrell defensive back Dennis Meyer received second-team honors.

Schedule

References

Arkansas State
Arkansas State Red Wolves football seasons
NCAA Small College Football Champions
College football undefeated seasons
Arkansas State Indians football